River City Science Academy (RCSA) is a charter school in Jacksonville, Florida, part of the Duval County School District. The school currently has four locations in Jacksonville and is known for its focus on STEM curriculum.

School grades
RCSA Middle-High currently has a "A" as of 2019 on the Florida School Accountability Grading Scale.
RCSA Elementary currently has a "A" as of 2019 on the Florida School Accountability Grading Scale.
RCSA Mandarin currently has a "A" as of 2019 on the Florida School Accountability Grading Scale.
RCSA Innovation currently has a "B" as of 2019 on the Florida School Accountability Grading Scale.

Academic programs
RCSA offers degree programs to its students including the gifted program, dual enrollment classes through Florida State College at Jacksonville and University of North Florida, the AP Capstone program, and multiple CTE electives.

Notable achievements
First public charter school in Duval County and surrounding areas to be granted an "A" grade by Florida Department of Education
In 2016, RCSA Elementary took home 1st place in the Science Olympiad State Competition.
RCSA is recognized as a Florida service-learning leader school by the Florida Department of Education
In 2018, RCSA Middle-High's Science Olympiad Team won first place in the state of Florida and competed at the National Competition in Colorado. In 2019, the team won second place in the state of Florida and competed at the National Competition in New York.
In 2019, RCSA Mandarin's SeaPerch Team won first place in the state of Florida. 
First public charter school to be granted high-performing status from the Florida Department of Education
Recipient of Five Star School Award
Recipient of School of Excellence Award

Athletics
RCSA Middle-High students can currently participate in volleyball, basketball, and cheerleading. Middle schooler's at RCSA Innovation can participate in volleyball, basketball, and track and field. The teams are part of the Florida High School Athletic Association.

References 

Charter schools in Florida
2007 establishments in Florida
Schools in Duval County, Florida
Science and technology studies